Shadley Benjamin Meier (born June 7, 1978) is a former professional American football tight end.

High School and College Career
Shad Meier prepped at Pittsburg High School, in his home town, where he was an All-State Top 11 Selection in Kansas in the fall of 1995 under legendary coach Larry Garman. He went on to enjoy a five-year playing career for the Kansas State Wildcats, where he was a two-year starter at tight end for Bill Snyder. He is one of the four Meier brothers to play college football.  His younger brother Dylan (now deceased) also played for the Wildcats.  The youngest brother Kerry played for the University of Kansas.

NFL career
Shad Meier was drafted as the 90th overall pick of  the 2001 NFL Draft for Tennessee Titans. The 6 foot 4 inches, 255 pounds, from Pittsburg, Kansas enjoyed a 6-year playing career in the NFL. He spent first four years of his NFL career with the Tennessee Titans. Meier was traded to the New Orleans Saints in 2004 before retiring in 2006.

Personal life
Meier is son of Dennis and Valerie Meier who reside in Pittsburg, Kansas. Meier is currently a Health/Wellness Teacher at Franklin High School in Franklin, Tennessee.

References

American football tight ends
Kansas State Wildcats football players
Tennessee Titans players
New Orleans Saints players
Living people
1978 births
People from Pittsburg, Kansas
Players of American football from St. Louis